Ashburton may refer to:

Australia
 Ashburton, Victoria, a suburb of Melbourne
 Ashburton railway station, Melbourne
 Shire of Ashburton, a shire in Western Australia
 Electoral district of Ashburton, a former state electorate in Western Australia
 Ashburton River (Western Australia), river in the Pilbara

New Zealand
 Ashburton, New Zealand, a town in Canterbury
 Ashburton Aerodrome, a small airport serving Ashburton
 Ashburton County, was one of the counties of New Zealand
 Ashburton District, which replaced Ashburton borough and county
 Ashburton (New Zealand electorate), a former electorate in New Zealand
 Ashburton River / Hakatere, river in the South Island

South Africa
 Ashburton, KwaZulu-Natal, a town in South Africa

United Kingdom
 Ashburton, Devon, a town in England
 Ashburton (UK Parliament constituency), a former UK Parliamentary constituency
 Ashburton railway station
 Ashburton, London, an area in the London Borough of Croydon, England
 Ashburton (ward), a ward in the London Borough of Croydon, England
 Ashburton Grove, the location of the Emirates Stadium, home of London's Arsenal Football Club
 Ashburton Learning Village, in Croydon

United States
 Ashburton, Baltimore, Maryland, a neighborhood

See also
 Baron Ashburton, British title
 Ashburton (Jersey) Limited
 Ashburton River (disambiguation)